HMS Belton was a  of the Royal Navy, launched on 3 October 1955 at Doigs Shipyard, Grimsby.

Belton joined the Fishery Protection Squadron in 1958, and remained part of the Squadron in 1962. Belton ran aground in Loch Maddy, North Uist in the Outer Hebrides on 23 October 1971. She was eventually refloated and taken to Greenock in Scotland but was found to be beyond economical repair. Although she never put to sea under her own power again, it was not until 25 November 1974 that she was sold for disposal.

References

Ton-class minesweepers of the Royal Navy
Ships built on the Humber
1955 ships
Cold War minesweepers of the United Kingdom
Ships of the Fishery Protection Squadron of the United Kingdom